The Cocarde class was a class of three 40-gun/12-pounder frigates of the French Navy. They were designed by Pierre Duhamel in 1793.

 Cocarde Nationale 
Builder: St Malo
Ordered: 16 May 1793
Laid down: August 1793
Launched: 29 April 1794
Completed: July 1794
Fate: Deleted 14 June 1803

 Régénérée
Builder: St Malo
Ordered: 16 May 1793
Laid down: September 1793
Launched: 1 November 1794
Completed: April 1795 
Fate: captured by British Navy 27 September 1801 at Alexandria, becoming HMS Alexandria.

 Bravoure
Builder: St Servan
Ordered: 
Laid down: October 1793
Launched: November 1795 
Completed: November 1796
Fate: run ashore near Leghorn to avoid capture 1 September 1801.

Cocarde